Barlow may refer to:

Places

Canada
Barlow River (Chibougamau River), Quebec
Barlow, Yukon, a local community of Yukon

New Zealand
Barlow River (New Zealand), a river in New Zealand
North Barlow River, a river in New Zealand

United Kingdom
Barlow Common, a village in Derbyshire, England
Barlow, Derbyshire, England
Barlow, North Yorkshire, England 
Barlow Woodseats Hall, Derbyshire, England

United States
Barlow, Alabama, an unincorporated community in Washington County, Alabama
Barlow, Kentucky
Barlow, Missouri
Barlow, North Dakota
Barlow, Ohio
Barlow, Oregon
Barlow Township, Washington County, Ohio
Barlow Pass (disambiguation), one of several mountain passes in the United States

Buildings
Barlow Hall, an historic building in Manchester, England
Barlow Planetarium, a part of the University of Wisconsin-Fox Valley
Barlow Respiratory Hospital, a specialized hospital in Los Angeles, California (US)
Barlow Woodseats Hall, an historic building in Barlow, England
William Barlow House, a historic house in Oregon (US)

Business
Barlow Lyde & Gilbert, an international law firm
Hill and Barlow, a Massachusetts (US) law firm (now dissolved)
Barloworld Limited, a South African industrial brand management company

Education
The Barlow RC High School, a comprehensive secondary school in south Manchester, England
Joel Barlow High School, a secondary school in Connecticut (US)
Sam Barlow High School, a secondary school in Oregon (US)

People
Barlow (musician), a Canadian singer-songwriter
Barlow (surname)

Science and technology
Barlow's disease (disambiguation), a term for scurvy or for mitral valve prolapse
Barlow's formula, for calculation of the internal pressure that a pipe can withstand
Barlow knife, a certain pattern of traditional slipjoint pocket knife
Barlow's law, an incorrect theory of a wire's electric current-carrying ability
Barlow lens, a diverging lens used in telescope eyepieces
Barlow maneuver, a test performed on infants to identify possible hip problems
Barlow Memorial Medal, a recognition by Canadian mining society
Barlow rail, an early kind of railway rail
Barlow surface, a mathematical construct
Barlow's wheel, an early demonstration of an electric motor
Wigan-Barlow, a 1922-1923 English automobile

Other uses
Barlow and Chambers execution, 1986 hanging in Malaysia
Barlow Endowment, a scholarship for musical study (US)
Barlow's lark, a bird native to Namibia and South Africa
Barlow Moor, a wilderness area in England
Barlow Road, a segment of the US Oregon Trail
15466 Barlow, an asteroid

See also 

Barlough
Bartow (disambiguation)

ja:バロー